Fortunat Joseph Strowski de Robkowa (16 May 1866 – 11 July 1952) was a French literary historian, essayist and critic. A specialist on Pascal and Montaigne, he superintended the first critical edition of Montaigne's Essays.

Life
Fortunat Strowski was born in Carcassonne  to a Jewish family from Galicia, then a province of the Austro-Hungarian Empire. He was educated in France, where he was a student of Ferdinand Brunetière.

In 1906 Strowski produced an edition of Montaigne's Essays based upon the Bordeaux copy (a copy of the fifth edition, with additions in Montaigne's own hand, preserved in the Bordeaux City Library), rather than the posthumously published 1595 edition of the Essays.

In 1930 Strowksi was named professor of contemporary French history at the Sorbonne. In 1939 he took up a position at the new Universidade do Brasil in Rio de Janeiro. He died in Cervières in France in 1952.

Works
 Saint François de Sales; introduction à l'histoire du sentiment religieux en France au dix-septième siècle, 1897
 Histoire du sentiment religieux en France au XVIIe siècle: Pascal et son temps, 1907
 Tableau de la littérature française au XIXe siècle, 1912
 Tableau de la littérature française : au XIXe siècle et au XXe siècle, 1924
 La sagesse française: Montaigne, Saint François de Sales, Descartes, La Rochefoucauld, Pascal, 1925
 Les Pensées de Pascal; étude et analyse, 1929
 Montaigne; sa vie publique et privée , 1938

References

Further reading
 Maurice Levaillant, 'Un Montaigniste souriant : Fortunat Strowski (1866-1952)', Bulletin de la Société des Amis de Montaigne, 1953-1954, pp. 73–87

1866 births
1952 deaths
People from Carcassonne
École Normale Supérieure alumni
20th-century French essayists
French literary historians
French literary critics
French male essayists
Members of the Académie des sciences morales et politiques